Eggen is a Norwegian surname. Notable people with the surname include:

Arne Eggen (1881–1955), Norwegian composer and organist
Arnljot Eggen (1923–2009), Norwegian poet
Dan Eggen (born 1970), Norwegian footballer
David Eggen (born 1962), Canadian politician
Eystein Eggen (1944–2010), Norwegian author laureate
Gjermund Eggen (1941–2019), Norwegian cross country skier
Jo Eggen (born 1952), Norwegian Contemporary poet
Knut Thorbjørn Eggen (1960–2012), Norwegian football coach
Nils Arne Eggen (1941–2022), Norwegian football coach
Olin J. Eggen (1919–1998),  American astronomer
Torgrim Eggen (born 1958), Norwegian author
Vegar Eggen Hedenstad (born 1991), Norwegian football defender

Norwegian-language surnames